Filippa Savva (born 28 May 1999) is a Cypriot footballer who plays as a midfielder for Apollon Ladies F.C. and has appeared for the Cyprus women's national team.

Club career
Savva joined AEK Kokkinochorion in 2011. She was still at the club in the 2016–17 Cypriot First Division, playing 12 games and scoring three goals. In February 2018, Savva transferred to Liverpool Feds. In August 2019, Fran Alonso, the manager who signed Savva for Liverpool Feds, brought her to his new club Lewes.

International career
Savva has been capped for the Cyprus national team, appearing for the team during the UEFA Women's Euro 2021 qualifying cycle.

International goals

References

External links
 
 

1999 births
Living people
Cypriot women's footballers
Cyprus women's international footballers
Women's association football midfielders
Lewes F.C. Women players
Expatriate women's footballers in England
Liverpool Feds W.F.C. players